Pethbugh is a village in Anantnag tehsil in Anantnag District in the Indian union territory of Jammu and Kashmir. The Pin code of Pethbugh is 192210 and postal head office is Dialgam. The Present Lambardar of Pethbugh is Mr.Fayaz Ahmad Bhat.Pethbugh is surrounded by Anantnag Tehsil towards the north, Qazigund Tehsil towards the south, Qaimoh Tehsil towards the west, and Pahloo Tehsil towards the east. Anantnag, Srinagar, Udhampur, and Rajauri are the nearby cities to Pethbugh. This place is in the border of the Anantnag and Kulgam districts.The nearst Railway Station (1.5km)Towards the West is SADURA.The Block Office of the village is BDO Office Larkipora  (Shahabad).The Nearest Villages on Boundry line are, Dialgam,Kamad,Ugjan, Schichen, Fathepora, and Sadoora

Demographics

Kashmiri is the local language. People also speaks English Urdu and Hindi

Transport

By Rail
Sadura Railway Station and Qazigund Railway Station are the very nearby railway stations to Pethbugh. However Jammu Tawi railway station is major railway station  near to Pethbugh.

Nearest Bus Stand is Achabal Adda Anantnag(6km)

Education

Colleges
 Government Degree college Doru
 Government Degree college (Boys) Anantnag
 Government Degree college (Women's) Anantnag

Schools
 M S Pethbugh
 M S Dialgam
 H S S Dialgam
 P S Pethnugh bungam

See also
 Doru shahabad
 Khanabal
 Chowgam
 Awantipora
 Kulgam District
 Pahalgam
 Fatehpora

References

 Articles about Anantnag in The Economic Times

Ancient Indian cities
Cities and towns in Anantnag district